Nationality words link to articles with information on the nation's poetry or literature (for instance, Irish or France).

Events
 Stephen Hawes appointed to Valet de chambre under Henry VII of England
 Poet Laureate John Skelton imprisoned

Works published

Italy
 Pietro Bembo, Terzerime, published by Aldus Manutius
 Baptista Mantuanus, Sylvae, eight volumes, Bologna; Italian, Latin-language poet
 Jacopo Sannazaro, Arcadia, a pirated edition (the author officially sanctioned publication in 1504); a manuscript of the original work is dated 1489, with two eclogues and connecting prose added later, seemingly reflecting the author's distress at political developments of about 1500; Italy

Other
 Conradus Celtis, Amores, folk poem, German poet writing in Latin

Births
Death years link to the corresponding "[year] in poetry" article:
 Guillaume Bigot (died 1550), French writer, doctor, humanist and poet in French and Latin
 Benedetto Varchi, some sources say he may have been born this year or 1503, others say his birth year is 1503 (died 1565), Italian, Latin-language poet

Deaths
Birth years link to the corresponding "[year] in poetry" article:
 February – Olivier de la Marche (born 1426), French poet and chronicler
 Also:
 Elisio Calenzio (born 1430), Italian, Latin-language poet
 Jalaladdin Davani (born 1426), Iranian philosopher, theologian, jurist and poet
 Gian Giacomo della Croce, died after this year (born c. 1450), Italian, Latin-language poet
 Gwerful Mechain, died about this year (born c. 1460?), female Welsh erotic poet
 Bonino Mombrizio, died 1482 or this year (born 1424), Italian, Latin-language poet
 Octavien de Saint-Gelais (born 1468), French churchman, poet and translator
 Domnall mac Brian Ó hÚigínn (born unknown), Irish poet
 Sōgi 宗祇 (born 1421), Japanese Zen monk who studied waka and renga poetry, then became a professional renga poet in his 30s

See also

 Poetry
 16th century in poetry
 16th century in literature
 French Renaissance literature
 Grands Rhétoriqueurs
 Renaissance literature
 Spanish Renaissance literature

Notes

16th-century poetry
Poetry